Central Hockey League was an ice hockey league that was played by teams in Minnesota from 1931 to 1935. The league was created by amateur teams in Minnesota. The first season (1931–32) the league was made up of amateur players. The following season it was made up of professional players. The league was merged into the American Hockey Association after 1935.

Members

Eveleth Rangers 1931–35
Hibbing Maroons 1931–33/Miners 1933–34
Minneapolis Millers 1931–35
St. Paul Saints 1931–35
Virginia (Minn) Rockets 1931–32
Duluth Natives 1932–33
Duluth Hornets 1933–34

Champions
1931–32 Minneapolis
1932–33 Eveleth
1933–34 Minneapolis
1934–35 St. Paul

Sources

Defunct ice hockey leagues in the United States
Ice hockey in Minnesota